The Federal Appendix was a case law reporter published by West Publishing from 2001 to 2021.  It published judicial opinions of the United States courts of appeals that were not expressly selected or designated for publication.  Such "unpublished" cases are ostensibly without value as precedent.  However, the Supreme Court made a change to the Federal Rules of Appellate Procedure in 2006.  Now, Rule 32.1 says that federal circuit courts are not allowed to prohibit the citation of unpublished opinions issued on or after January 1, 2007.

Opinions of all the United States courts of appeals are included in the Federal Appendix. "Published" opinions of the U.S. courts of appeals are published in the Federal Reporter.

The Federal Appendix organizes court opinions within each volume by the date of the decision, and includes the full text of the court's opinion.  West attorney editors add headnotes that summarize key principles of law in the cases, and Key Numbers that classify the decisions by topic within the West American Digest System.

861 hardbound volumes of the Federal Appendix were issued. Publication of Federal Appendix ceased in 2021, but nonprecedential United States courts of appeals opinions are still available on Westlaw. Westlaw abbreviates citations to the Federal Appendix as Fed. Appx. The Bluebook calls for citations to the Federal Appendix to be abbreviated as F. App'x.

There is debate within the legal community about the desirability of designating certain judicial opinions as without precedential value.

External links
Official West Publishing site for the Federal Appendix

References

National Reporter System